Ennai Paar Yogam Varum is a 2007 Tamil language action comedy film directed by M. Jameen Raj. The film stars Mansoor Ali Khan and newcomer Manju, with Kandeepan, Kutty, Priyanka Shailu, R. Sundarrajan, Anuradha, Abhinayashree, Ponnambalam and Manikka Vinayagam playing supporting roles. The film, produced by Mansoor Ali Khan, was released on 6 July 2007 after many delays.

Plot

The lovers Meena and Jeeva elope and they decide to get married at the registrar's office. Meena's father Anandaraman orders the rowdy Jaga to bring him his daughter back and to put Jeeva in jail. At the registrar's office, Jaga and his sidekicks break the arm of the deputy tehsildar Krishnamoorthy and the forges his signature on a marriage document. Jaga tracks down the lovers in a police station and he blames Jeeva for kidnapping Meena and for signature forgery. Jeeva is then put in police lockup and Jaga forcefully brings Meena to her father.

Kandeepan falls in love with Jagadeeshwari and he makes his mother Seethamangalam Muthamma, a greedy and corrupt politician, accepts for the marriage. Krishnamoorthy decides to get VRS and puts all his savings to arrange his daughter's wedding. Thereafter, Muthamma makes a deal with a political leader: fixing the marriage between Kandeepan and the political leader's granddaughter. Muthamma then delegates Jaga the mission of stopping the wedding between her son and Jagadeeshwari. On the day of the marriage, Jaga wreaked havoc in the wedding hall and stops the marriage. Krishnamoorthy who felt humiliated and distraught of losing all his savings dies of a heart attack on the spot. Jagadeeshwari vows to take revenge on Jaga.

Later, Jagadeeshwari files a false rape complaint against Jaga and he is arrested by the police but he then comes out of jail thanks to his lawyer. Meanwhile, Jeeva, who is now in a wheelchair after a suicide attempt, and Meena meet Jagadeeshwari, and Jagadeeshwari promises them to arrange their marriage. Jaga feels guilty for Jeeva's accident and he himself arranges their marriage while Anandaraman genuinely accepts Jeeva as his son-in-law. Jaga later learns about Muthamma's true face and saves Jagadeeshwari from her. The film ends with Jaga and Jagadeeshwari falling in love with each other.

Cast

Mansoor Ali Khan as Jaga
Manju as Jagadeeshwari
Kandeepan as Kandeepan
Kutty as Jeeva
Priyanka Shailu as Meena
R. Sundarrajan as Anandaraman
Anuradha as Seethamangalam Muthamma
Abhinayashree as "Mobile" Lakshmi
Ponnambalam as Police inspector
Manikka Vinayagam as Krishnamoorthy
Vennira Aadai Moorthy as Bala Balasubramaniam
Kaka Radhakrishnan as Politician
Anu Mohan as Anandaraman's friend
Babitha as Jagadeeshwari's friend
Kumarimuthu as House owner
Pandu as Groom's father
Nellai Siva as Head constable
Muthukaalai as Man on cellphone
Chitti Babu as Singer
Thadi Balaji
Suruli Manohar as Suruli
Lollu Sabha Balaji as Groom
V. M. Subburaj as Lakshmi's husband
Idichapuli Selvaraj
Thideer Kannaiah
Kullamani
Bonda Mani as Jaga's sidekick
Benjamin as Jaga's sidekick
Venkatesh Prabhu Kasturi Raja as Jaga's sidekick
King Kong as Jaga's sidekick
Jinda as Jaga's sidekick
Vijay Ganesh as Party member
Kovai Senthil as Ganesan
Rajajirajan as MLA's relative
Vengal Rao as Henchman
L. V. Adhavan as L. V. Kannan (guest appearance)
Dr. Kaliyaperumal in a guest appearance
Lawyer Rajaram in a guest appearance
Thol. Thirumavalavan in a special appearance

Production
After producing three films under his own banner, actor Mansoor Ali Khan returned with Ennai Paar Yogam Varum. Politician-turned-actor Thol. Thirumavalavan appeared in a song in the film. Mansoor Ali Khan said that the film is a low budget film with comedy track.

Soundtrack

The soundtrack was composed by A. K. Vasagan. The soundtrack, released in 2007, features 6 tracks with lyrics written by Thiruvalluvar, Avvaiyar, Mansoor Ali Khan and A. K. Vasagan.

Release
On 4 June 2007, an ad for the film featured in a newspaper had attracted the attention of many. Mansoor Ali Khan had comically pleaded for a good theatre for his film. The film was originally slated for release on 15 June 2007 alongside the big-budget film Sivaji but due to shortage of theatres in Chennai city, Mansoor Ali Khan postponed the release of his film. It was finally released on 6 July 2007. A week after the film's release, another ad for his film had attracted the attention of the public with mentioning the film Kireedam (2007) starring Ajith Kumar.

References

2007 films
2000s Tamil-language films
Indian action comedy films
2007 directorial debut films
2007 action comedy films